The Miss Colorado competition is the pageant that selects the representative for the state of Colorado in the Miss America pageant. Colorado has won the Miss America crown on three occasions.

Savannah Cavanaugh of Beaver Creek, Colorado was crowned Miss Colorado 2022 on May 28, 2022 at The PACE Center in Parker, Colorado. She competed for the title of Miss America 2023 at the Mohegan Sun in Uncasville, Connecticut in December of 2022.

Results summary
The following is a visual summary of the past results of Miss Colorado titleholders at the national Miss America pageants/competitions. The year in parentheses indicates the year of the national competition during which a placement and/or award was garnered, not the year attached to the contestant's state title.

Placements 
 Miss Americas: Sharon Ritchie (1956), Marilyn Van Derbur (1958), Rebecca Ann King (1974)
 1st runners-up: Maya Walker (1989)
 2nd runners-up: Debbie Riecks (1990), Kelley Johnson (2016)
 3rd runners-up: Sylvia Canaday (1949), LaTayna Hall (1988)
 Top 7: Monica Thompson (2020)
 Top 10: Cheryl Sweeten (1964), Adria Easton (1970), Karrie Mitchell (1991), Ellery Jones (2019)
 Top 12: Katie Layman (2010)
 Top 15: Delores Conrad (1926)

Awards

Preliminary awards
 Preliminary Lifestyle and Fitness: Sylvia Canaday (1949), Karrie Mitchell (1991)

Non-finalist awards
 Non-finalist Talent: Tia Tyler (1968), Cathy Glau (1972), Suzan Hogan (1978), Kimberly Christiansen (1981), Deborah Davids (1983), Carol Johnson (1987), Michelle Stanley (1997), Keely Gaston (1999), Shannon Patilla (2017), Meredith Winnefeld (2018)

Other awards
 Miss Congeniality: Tia Tyler (1968)
 STEM Scholarship Award Winners: Kelley Johnson (2016)
 Women in Business Scholarship Award Winners: Meredith Winnefeld (2018)

Winners

Notes

References

External links
 Miss Colorado official website

Colorado culture
Colorado
Women in Colorado
Recurring events established in 1926
1926 establishments in Colorado
Annual events in Colorado